Gracillaria confectella is a moth of the family Gracillariidae. It is known from Australia.

Taxonomy
The present taxonomic status of this species is unknown. It is known to be misplaced in the genus Gracillaria, but has not been assigned to another genus yet.

References

Gracillariinae